Events in the year 2013 in Croatia.

Incumbents 
 President – Ivo Josipović
 Prime Minister – Zoran Milanović
 Speaker – Josip Leko

Events 
 April 14 – First European Parliament election
 May 19 – Local elections, first round
 June 2 – Local elections, second round
 July 1 – Croatia becomes the 28th member state of the European Union
 December 1 – Croatian constitutional referendum on the definition of marriage is held

Deaths 
 February 7 – Krsto Papić, film director
 February 13 – Ivan Večenaj, painter
 August 19 – Mirko Kovač, writer
 September 2 – Zvonko Bušić, Croatian independence activist
 September 23 – Vlatko Marković, football manager
 October 23 – Dolores Lambaša, actress
 October 27 – Vinko Coce, singer
 November 2 – Zlatko Crnković, translator

See also
2013 in Croatian television

 
Croatia
Years of the 21st century in Croatia
2010s in Croatia
Croatia